The Espinhaço: Alto Jequitinhonha – Serra do Cabral Mosaic, or simply Espinhaço Mosaic, is a protected area mosaic in the state of Minas Gerais, Brazil.

Background

The mountains lie between the cerrado biome to the west, Atlantic Forest to the east and caatinga to the north.
In the higher regions there are rocky fields, an ecosystem with considerable biodiversity.
In 2005 UNESCO recognized a large portion of the Espinhaço Chain in Minas Gerais as a Biosphere Reserve.

Discussions followed on how to better conserve the ecosystems, and the first proposals for a Mosaic of Units of Conservation of the Espinhaço: Alto Jequitinhonha - Serra do Cabral were made at the end of 2007. 
Official activities began in April 2008, coordinated by the Biotropics Institute, a scientific and conservationist NGO, in partnership with the Minas Gerais State Forest Institute (IEF) and with the support of Conservation International Brasil and the Chico Mendes Institute for Biodiversity Conservation (ICMBio).

It included seven fully protected units and five environmental protection areas in 14 municipalities: Itamarandiba, Senador Modestino Gonçalves, São Gonçalo do Rio Preto, Felício dos Santos, Rio Vermelho, Couto de Magalhães de Minas, Santo Antônio do Itambé, Serra Azul de Minas, Serro, Diamantina, Buenópolis, Joaquim Felício, Bocaiúva and Olhos-d'Água.

Organization

The Espinhaço Mosaic in the state of Minas Gerais was recognized by ordinance 444 of 26 November 2010, which also created the managing council.
The council includes representatives of public bodies and civil society organizations.
It is administered by the ICMBio.
As an integrated management tool for a set of conservation units that overlap or are near each other, the mosaic expands conservation actions beyond the scope of the individual units.

Component units

The mosaic was created with the following conservation units:

Notes

Sources

Further reading

Protected area mosaics of Brazil
Protected areas established in 2010
2010 establishments in Brazil
Protected areas of Minas Gerais